Hoarse & Roaring is the debut full-length album by neofolk band Parlor Hawk, released in 2010 on Northplatte Records. The album was produced by Joshua James and featured Neon Trees bassist Branden Campbell on each track (except "Saddest Song") as well as Fictionist member Stuart Maxfield on the tracks "14 Years" and "Home". It was mixed by Todd Burke (Ben Harper, Jack Johnson) and mastered by Reuben Cohen (Edward Sharpe & The Magnetic Zeros, Bruno Mars).

The album was chosen by iTunes Indie Spotlight as a "Best of 2010 Singer/Songwriter Album" and was featured on the Indie Spotlight page alongside other notable albums from that year.

Track listing

Personnel
Parlor Hawk
Andrew Clifford Capener– vocals, rhythm guitar
TJ Nockleby– guitar
Mark Garbett– piano, wurlitzer, additional vocals
Jay Tibbitts– drums

Additional musicians
Pat Campbell– additional drums, percussion
Branden Campbell– bass guitar (tracks 1 to 10)
Dylan Schorer- pedal steel guitar, lap steel (track 4)
Brian Hardy– Hammond B3 organ (tracks 2,5,7)
Sayde Price– additional vocals (tracks 4,6,8)
Evan Coulombe– nylon string guitar (track 10)
Nate Pyfer– mellotron, string arrangements, additional vocals (track 3)
Rachel Hicken– violin (track 8)
Jarom Xochimitl– cello (tracks 6,8)
Stuart Maxfield– mandolin, violin (tracks 1, 10)

Awards

References

2010 debut albums
Parlor Hawk albums